Coal sludge spill may refer to:

Buffalo Creek flood (February 26, 1972)
Kingston Fossil Plant coal fly ash slurry spill (December 22, 2008)
Martin County sludge spill (October 11, 2000)

See also
Hard coal spill on Bolinao (a spill from a barge on November 27, 2007)